is a town located in Fukushima Prefecture, Japan. ,  the town had an estimated population of 15,159 in 5487 households, and a population density of 170 persons per km2.

Geography
Aizubange is located in the northern portion of the Aizu region of Fukushima Prefecture in the western part of Aizu Basin. The basin extends from the center of the town to the east and is relatively flat, with many paddy fields. On the other hand, the western part of the town has many forests. The Aga River flows from the east to the north of the town, and the Tadami River flows to the west.

Mountains : Mount Takadera
Rivers : Tadami River, Agakawa

Neighboring municipalities
Fukushima Prefecture
Aizuwakamatsu
Kitakata
Yanaizu
Yugawa
Aizumisato
Nishiaizu

Climate
Aizubange has a Humid continental climate (Köppen Dfb) characterized by warm summers and cold winters with heavy snowfall.  The average annual temperature in Aizubange is 11.6 °C. The average annual rainfall is 1399 mm with September as the wettest month. The temperatures are highest on average in August, at around 25.2 °C, and lowest in January, at around -1.2 °C.

Demographics
Per Japanese census data, the population of Aizubange has declined steadily over the past 60 years.

History
The area of present-day Aizubange was part of ancient Mutsu Province. The area formed part of the holdings of Aizu Domain during the Edo period. After the Meiji Restoration, the area was organized as part of Kawanuma District. Fukushima Prefecture.  The town of Bange was established on April 1, 1889 with the creation of the modern municipalities system. The town of Aizubange was founded on April 1, 1955, by the merger of the town of Bange with the Wakamiya, Kanagami, Hirose, Kawanishi and Yawata.

Economy
The economy of Aizubange is centered on the production of rice, with much of the town area under paddy fields.

Education
Aizubange has two public elementary schools and one public junior high school operated by the town government. The town has two public high schools operated by the Fukushima Prefectural Board of Education.

Transportation

Railway
 JR East – Tadami Line
  –  –  –

Highway
  – Aizubange IC

Local attractions
 Kamegamori-Chinjumori Kofun (National Historic Site)
 site of Jingamine Castle (National Historic Site)
 Eryū-ji – Buddhist temple with Important Cultural Property Kannon-dō.

Noted people from Aizubange
Kiyoshi Saitō, artist
Takeda Sōkaku, martial artist
Hachiro Kasuga, singer
Hiroshi Takahashi, manga artist

References

External links

Official Website 

Towns in Fukushima Prefecture
Aizubange, Fukushima